Frederick Gough, 4th Baron Calthorpe (14 June 1790 – 2 May 1868), known as Hon. Frederick Gough-Calthorpe until 1851, of Elvetham Hall, Hartley Wintney, Hampshire, was a British peer and Member of Parliament.

He was born the 4th son of Henry Gough-Calthorpe, 1st Baron Calthorpe, and succeeded his elder brother (the youngest of his three elder brothers to die before him) as the 4th Baronet in 1851.

He was elected Member of Parliament for Hindon in 1818, holding the seat until 1826. He was then elected to represent Bramber from 1826 to 1831.  In 1845 he changed his surname by royal licence from Gough-Calthorpe to Gough. He was appointed High Sheriff of Staffordshire for 1848–1849 (the family also owned Perry Hall in Perry Barr, then in Staffordshire).

He died in 1868. He had married in 1823, Lady Charlotte Sophia Somerset, the daughter of Henry Somerset, 6th Duke of Beaufort, and had four sons and six daughters. He was succeeded by his eldest son Frederick Gough-Calthorpe, 5th Baron Calthorpe.

References

1790 births
1868 deaths
Gough-Calthorpe family
Members of the Parliament of the United Kingdom for English constituencies
UK MPs 1818–1820
UK MPs 1820–1826
UK MPs 1826–1830
UK MPs 1830–1831
Calthorpe, B4
High Sheriffs of Staffordshire
4